Messatida is a former municipality in Achaea, West Greece, Greece. Since the 2011 local government reform it is part of the municipality Patras, of which it is a municipal unit. The seat of the municipality was in Ovrya. It is located south of Patras city centre, and stretches from the urbanized plains near the Gulf of Patras to the Omplos hills in the east. The population was 13,852 in 2011. It has an area of 66.366 km².

Messatida was named after the ancient Achaean town Mesatis, according to local legend the place where Dionysus was reared.

Population history

Subdivisions
The municipal unit Messatida is subdivided into the following communities (constituent villages in brackets):
Kallithea (Kallithea, Ano Kallithea)
Krini (Krini, Agios Kostantinos)
Krystallovrysi
Ovrya
Petroto (Petroto, Mavromandila, Agia Paraskevi)
Saravali (Saravali, Agios Stefanos, Demenika, Kefalovryso, Bakari)
Thea (Thea, Lygies, Pavlokastro)

Sport Clubs
Fostiras Ovrias FC (football)
Achilleas Ovrias (football)
Atlas Ovrias (football)
Milon Ovrias (volleyball)
Phoenix Ovrias (basketball)
Achaios Saravali (football & basketball)
Galini Demenika (basketball, ping pong, baseball, football & softball)
Krini 97' (basketball)
A.O. Krini (football)
A.O. Thea (football)
A.O. Kalithea (football)
Galaxias Demenika (basketball)
Ikaros Petroto (football)

References

External links

GTP - Messatida
GTP - Ancient Messatis

 
Populated places in Achaea